The pair skating competition of the 1960 Winter Olympics was held at the Blyth Arena in Squaw Valley, California, United States. The event took place on Friday 19 February 1960. Each judge ranked the skaters by Ordinal Placement from first to last place. If a skater was ranked first by a majority of the judges, that skater was placed first overall; this process was repeated for each place. If more than one skater had a majority ranking for the same position, then a series of tiebreaks were in place, indicated in order in the Results section below.

Barbara Wagner / Robert Paul won gold for Canada, having not been beaten since the 1956 Winter Olympics.

Results

Referee:
  Walter S. Powell

Assistant Referee:
  Alexander D.C. Gordon

Judges:
  Sydney R. Croll
  Franz Wojtanowskyj
  John Greig
  Theo Klemm
  Giovanni de Mori 
  Emile Finsterwald
  Howell Janes

References

External links
 1960 Squaw Valley Official Olympic Report
 sports-reference

Figure skating at the 1960 Winter Olympics
Mixed events at the 1960 Winter Olympics